Out to Lunch is a prime-time television special that was broadcast on December 10, 1974, on ABC, from 9 to 10pm ET. It mixed the Sesame Street Muppets and the cast of The Electric Company along with guest stars Elliott Gould, Barbara Eden and Carol Burnett. This is the first and one of the few Sesame Street-related productions directly produced by The Jim Henson Company (the others being the 1989 television special Sesame Street… 20 Years & Still Counting and the 1999 feature film The Adventures of Elmo in Grouchland).

A member of the Electric Company cast, Rita Moreno, received an Emmy nomination in 1975 for her participation in the show in the category of Outstanding Continuing or Single Performance by a Supporting Actress in Variety or Music.

Plot
In the program, ABC News anchor Bill Beutel and his stage manager wrapped up a newscast and left the studio to take a lunch break. After they leave, the Muppets and the cast of The Electric Company take over the studio to fill an hour of programming on ABC while the studio staff is on break.

Cast
 Luis Ávalos - Casino owner
 Bill Beutel - Himself
 Jim Boyd - Stage manager and gambler
 Carol Burnett - Herself
 Barbara Eden - Herself
 Morgan Freeman - Croupier
 Judy Graubart - Herself
 Elliott Gould - Divorced husband
 Skip Hinnant - Himself and spectator
 Rita Moreno - Herself, divorced wife, and spectator
 Gary Owens - Announcer
 Hattie Winston - Herself

Muppet performers
 Jim Henson - Kermit the Frog, Ernie, and Guy Smiley
 Richard Hunt - Various
 Jerry Nelson - Herry Monster, Count von Count, Mr. Snuffleupagus, and Anything Muppet Dog
 Frank Oz - Bert, Cookie Monster, and Grover
 Caroll Spinney - Oscar the Grouch and Big Bird

External links
 Out To Lunch at Muppet Wiki
 

Sesame Street features
The Electric Company (TV series)
1970s American television specials
ABC News
American Broadcasting Company television specials
1974 television specials
Television series about television